The Wesley's Mysterious File (衛斯理藍血人) is a 2002 Hong Kong action science fiction film directed by Andrew Lau starring Andy Lau, Rosamund Kwan and Shu Qi.  Hong Kong director Wong Jing also makes a cameo appearance.

Summary
The film tells the story of Wesley (Andy Lau) who works in San Francisco for a UN department investigating extra terrestrial sightings. When Fong (Rosamund Kwan) an alien from the Dark Blue Planet arrives in town seeking the remains of her brother, Wesley; Fong and two agents from a secret FBI alien department (Shu Qi and Roy Cheung) become entangled in a conspiracy involving the government departments and two different alien species.

Cast
Andy Lau as Wesley
Rosamund Kwan as Fong Tin-ai
Shu Qi as Pak Sue
Wong Jing as Dr. Kwok
Mark Cheng as Kill
Almen Wong as Rape
Roy Cheung as Pak Kei-wai
Samuel Pang as Tan
Patrick Lung as Mr. Chu
Yo Yo Fong as Ling-ling
Thomas Hudak as Wilson
Beverly Hotsprings
Tré Shine
Vincent Zhao

See also
 Girls with guns
 Wisely Series, the novel series by Ni Kuang
 Films and television series adapted from the Wisely Series:
 The Seventh Curse, a 1986 Hong Kong film starring Chow Yun-fat as Wisely
 The Legend of Wisely, a 1987 Hong Kong film starring Sam Hui as Wisely
 The Cat (1992 film), a 1992 Hong Kong film starring Waise Lee as Wisely
 The New Adventures of Wisely, a 1998 Singaporean television series starring Michael Tao as Wisely
 The 'W' Files, a 2003 Hong Kong television series starring Gallen Lo as Wisely

References

External links
 

2002 films
2000s Cantonese-language films
Hong Kong science fiction action films
2002 science fiction action films
Films directed by Andrew Lau
Films set in Hong Kong
Films shot in Hong Kong
Films set in San Francisco
Films shot in San Francisco
Fictional government investigations of the paranormal
China Star Entertainment Group films
2000s Hong Kong films